Wilner Piquant (born 4 December 1951) was a Haitian international footballer with Haitian club Violette A.C. and was part of the Haitian Squad at the World Cup in Germany in 1974. He played as a goalkeeper. Piquent played in three 1978 World Cup qualifiers and six 1982 World Cup qualifiers, the last of these being a 1–1 draw with Mexico in the 1981 CONCACAF Championship in Tegucigalpa. In 1978, he played in the National Soccer League with Ottawa Tigers.

References

External links
FIFA Profile

1951 births
Living people
Association football goalkeepers
Haitian footballers
Haitian expatriate footballers
Expatriate soccer players in Canada
Haitian expatriate sportspeople in Canada
Canadian National Soccer League players
Violette AC players
Ligue Haïtienne players
Haiti international footballers
1974 FIFA World Cup players
Aigle Noir AC players